Farinetta is type of buckwheat flour. The name is a registered trademark owned by Minn-Dak Growers, Ltd.

Farinetta is made from a mixture of aleurone layer of hulled seed and seed embryo and contains about 35% protein, as compared to about 12% in the whole grain.

References 

Flour